The 2013 Formula Abarth season was the ninth and the final season of the former Formula Azzurra, and the fourth under its guise of "Formula Abarth". The series returned to a one-championship format, dropping the European Series moniker. The season started at Vallelunga on 28 April and concluded at 20 October at Monza.

Teams and drivers
All teams were Italian-registered.

Race calendar and results
 A provisional all-Italian six-round calendar was announced on 4 December 2012. On 5 February 2013, the calendar was altered, and was altered again on 13 March.

Championship standings
Points were awarded as follows:

Drivers' standings

Rookies' standings

Teams' standings

References

External links
 Official website

Formula Abarth
Formula Abarth
Abarth